The Desiré Delano Bouterse Highway is the first motorway in Suriname between Afobakaweg connecting Paramaribo and Brokopondo to the John F. Kennedyweg near Johan Adolf Pengel International Airport. The motorway opened on 15 May 2020 12:00.

A journey from Paramaribo to the airport used to take 1.5 to 2 hours. It is hoped that with the new highway, the travel time can be reduced to one hour. Construction of the road started in November 2017. The highway was named after President Dési Bouterse.

The project had cost $60 million. The speed limit will be 80 km/h, and cameras will be placed on the road.

Route
The motorway begins on an at grade intersection with the Afobakaweg leading to Paramaribo and Brokopondo, cross the Para Creek which flows into the Suriname River using the Hanover bridge, and end on an at grade intersection with the John F. Kennedyweg, located near the airport and giving access to the Southern East-West Link, thus avoiding the built-up areas of Lelydorp and Onverwacht. The road has 2x2 lanes without a hard shoulder over its entire length, and has no exits.  The total length of the highway is 9.6 kilometers.

References

Motorways in Suriname
Roads in Suriname